The Houston Christian Huskies men's basketball team, known as the Houston Baptist Huskies until 2022, represents Houston Christian University in Houston, Texas, in NCAA Division I men's basketball competition. The team is coached by Ron Cottrell.

The Huskies competed as members of the Trans America Athletic Conference from 1978 to 1989. After their departure from the TAAC, the Huskies went on a two year hiatus before returning to the NAIA. HBU competed in the NAIA from 1991–2008. They returned to NCAA Division I for the 2008–2009 season, where they were initially an independent, followed by membership in the Great West Conference from 2009 through 2013. They moved to the Southland Conference in the 2013–14 season.

History

Postseason results

NCAA tournament results 
Houston Christian has been to the NCAA tournament once. Its record is 0–1.

CBI results 
Houston Christian has appeared in one College Basketball Invitational (CBI). Its record is 0–1.

CIT results 
Houston Christian has appeared in one CollegeInsider.com Postseason Tournament (CIT). Its record is 0–1.

NAIA results 
Houston Christian has appeared in the NAIA Division I tournament 10 times. Their combined record is 3–10.

Notable players 
 E.C. Coleman (1969–73)
 Anicet Lavodrama (1981–85)

External links 

 

 
Basketball teams established in 1963
1963 establishments in Texas